WilliamMustBeControl'd (also known as Willy-G) is a Hip Hop music producer based in Windhoek, Namibia.

He is a member of the Cool Under Pressure (C.U.P) group and has worked with artists including Paradox, J-Black, Gazza (musician), KP Illest, Hansolo and the late Catty Catt.

Early life
WilliamMustBeControl'd became involved in music at a young age. Hip hop has had a profound influence on his music. At the age of 12, he learned the basics of FL Studios and began to produce shortly after.

Career 
William has produced major hit songs that have topped music charts in Africa.

He released the instrumental compilation, Foundation, in 2013 which is available on DatPiff.com.

He and producer Nasha Blaque teamed up on projects producing for headline artists in Southern-Africa as well as releasing free instrumental compilations online under the collective name PNRMA. 

Following a series of free releases, during late 2015, WilliamMustBeControl'd and Nasha Blaque hosted Namibia's first beats auction. The event is a musical art exhibition, an event where artists, writers and managers can congregate to network, appreciate creative sounds and eventually bid to buy instrumentals.

Discography

Beat tapes
 Foundation (2013)
 Common Ground (with Nasha Blaque) (2013)
 Many-More (2014)
 Beat Vacay (with Nasha Blaque) (2015)

Productions (studio albums)
 Hansolo - HVSDB (2014)
 KP Illest - Kill Your TV 3 (2015)
 Paradox - Catch22 (2015)
 JBlack - Black By Popular Demand (2015)
 Hansolo - Reckless Youth (2017)
 Cool Under Pressure - Free Money (2017)

Singles
 #2014 (ft.Paradox, KP Illest & South-West) (2014)
 Witness Power (ft. AliThatDude, L.t.D, KP Illest & Hansolo) (2014)
 Royalty (ft. Lioness, Hansolo & JBlack) (2014)
 They Feeling Me Now (ft. Da Maq, Skrypt, Kwame Sankara, Mr. Diamonds & Hansolo) (2015)
 Kutumba (ft. K.K, Paradox, SouthWest & Tesh) (2015)

International Productions
 Hansolo & Ees - Yeye (2015)
 Paradox & Riky Rick - #MrWellDone (2016)

Remix singles
 Started From The Bottom ft.Gazza (musician) (2013)

References

External links
 

Namibian composers
Namibian hip hop musicians
Living people
1992 births
Musicians from Windhoek